is a side-scrolling action-platform arcade video game developed by Alpha Denshi and originally published by SNK on April 26, 1990. It was one of the launch titles for both the Neo Geo MVS (arcade) and Neo Geo AES (home) platforms, in addition of also being one of the pack-in games for the AES.

When the evil sorcerer Gal Agiese breaks free from his imprisonment and steals the magic tomes that were used against him centuries ago, the magician Elta embarks on a journey to recover the stolen magic tomes from the hands of Gal and his followers before the god of destruction, Az Atorse, is revived and destroys both the land of Cadacis and the world. Though it was initially launched for the Neo Geo MVS, Magician Lord was later released for both Neo Geo AES and Neo Geo CD in 1991 and 1994 respectively, and has since been re-released on compilations and through download services for various consoles, among other ways to play it.

Upon its original release, Magician Lord received praise for its colorful and detailed graphics, sound department, gameplay and for being a showcase of the capabilities of the Neo Geo, though critics felt divided in regards to the difficulty and was considered a financial flop in arcades, despite the positive reception it garnered. Retrospective reviews for the title have been mixed in recent years, with reviewers praising the graphics and sound but criticizing its challenging difficulty. A sequel was in development but was never released.

Gameplay 

Magician Lord is a side-scrolling action-platform game similar to Ghouls 'n Ghosts and Rastan where the player takes control of Elta, the main protagonist, through eight stages of varying themes set in the land of Cadacis, where the main objective is to recover eight mystical books that were stolen by Gal Agiese, one of the main antagonists by defeating his servants, along with one of his creations that act as a boss at the end of the stage to progress further.

Some of the levels featured are linear in nature, populated with obstacles and enemies, requiring the player to traverse the stage by running, jumping, climbing, shooting or dodging enemies, while other levels that are featured later in the game become more maze-like and exploratory, making the player take different routes to reach the end and if the player takes too long to complete the level, an invincible creature appears and starts following Elta until he is killed and respawns on the same location where he died. Once all lives are lost, the game is over unless the player inserts more credits into the arcade machine to continue playing. If a memory card is present, the player is allowed to save their progress and resume the last stage the game is saved at. As with many earlier games released by SNK, it is well known for its high difficulty.

All of the levels in the game have doors that can be opened by pressing up on the joystick, leading to rooms that can either benefit or harm the player and finding the correct door will lead the player to the miniboss of the level, while in the AES version these also act as checkpoints. One of the main features of the game is the ability to transform into powerful beings by picking up combinations of colored orbs found throughout the stages inside treasure chests, granting the player new forms to attack enemies and bosses. When he is not transformed, the primary form of attack for Elta is a weak but fast-moving energy projectile that he can shoot in four directions.

Some of the transformations available in the game are the following by grabbing the same-colored orbs in a row or by combining them:

 Dragon Warrior: In this form, Elta becomes a dragon and attacks by breathing a continuous short-range fire attack that can also be aimed diagonally, unlike his standard attack.
 Waterman:  In this form, Elta attacks with water bubbles that burst into water pillars upon touching the ground but only cover a small area.
 Poseidon: A more powerful version of the Waterman form, Poseidon can shoot powerful waves of water that travel along the ground for several hits but this form moves very slowly.
 Shinobi: In this form, Elta becomes a Shinobi, gaining an increase in agility and attacks with powerful magical arcs of fire, covering a wide area but are slow-moving.
 Samurai: Though limited in range, the Samurai is the only form that allows Elta to attack through walls, shields or multiple enemies, using a boomerang-styled attack that deals heavy damage.
 Raijin: The Raijin form gives a big boost to the jumping ability of Elta, as well as a unique attack that creates a continuous electrical field around his body.

Plot 
Once upon a time, the peaceful and prosperous land of Cadacis and its people were almost at the brink of extermination due to the sudden emergence of a sorcerer named Gal Agiese, whose evil power brought a legion of monsters to invade upon the land and seeking to resurrect Az Atorse, a demonic god of destruction, to conquer the land of Cadacis and the world. When all hope seemed to be completely lost as the demons were about to take control completely, a young magician capable of many feats appeared and fought against the unleashed beasts, in addition to sealing both Gal and Az away into a collection of eight magical tomes. The young magician later became known as the "Magician Lord" after saving the world from evil, and several years went on with peace reigning supreme on Cadacis. However, the seal weakened with time and Gal Agiese escaped from it, resurrecting himself and stealing the eight magical tomes as a result, spreading destruction into the land once more and seeking to revive Az Atorse again. Elta, the last descendant of the "Magician Lord", goes on a journey to retrieve the eight magical tomes from Gal and his henchmen, before Az is completely resurrected. After defeating the demonic henchmen, Elta arrives at the tower where Gal Agiese resides, who managed to summon Az Atorse before being sealed once again by Elta and after defeating and sealing the god of destruction, peace returns to Cadacis once again and the legend of "Magician Lord" is reborn.

Development and release 

Development and planning of Magician Lord started in the first quarter of 1989, a year before the Neo Geo was announced and released to the public in Japan. The game underwent a beta location testing in January 1990, and this early version of the game featured longer stages that were deemed not suitable for arcade play and as such, the developer scaled down the levels but some were cut in the final version. It was the first title developed by Alpha Denshi for the Neo Geo platform and featured graphical effects such as zooming and rotation. There were originally 27 planned transformations that players could morph into, but only six were finalized due to gameplay changes during development. The game was also showcased for the first time in North America during the 1990 ACME show in Chicago. The soundtrack for the game was composed by Hideki Yamamoto, Hiroaki Shimizu and Yuka Watanabe.

Magician Lord was initially launched for arcades on April 26, 1990. The game was also released during the same period for the Neo Geo AES, when the system was originally a rental-only system for video game stores and hotels in Japan, but this was later reversed due to high demand and price, coming into the market as a luxury console on July 1, 1991. Unlike other games that were later released for the Neo Geo, there are several differences between the MVS and AES versions of the game such as the increase of hit points for the player, the inclusion of an introductory sequence, among other changes, while later reprints of the AES version included the original MVS ROM image. It was re-released for the Neo Geo CD on October 31, 1994, featuring a CD-quality soundtrack and other changes. The game also made multiple appearances on Nickelodeon's 1992 children's game show Nick Arcade.

The game has received multiple re-releases in recent years on various digital distribution platforms such as the Virtual Console, PlayStation Network, Nintendo eShop and Xbox Live. It was also released on the SNK Arcade Classics Vol. 1 compilation for the PlayStation 2, PlayStation Portable and the Wii in 2008. Magician Lord was also one of the 20 pre-loaded games included on the Neo Geo X. The game was also recently included in the international version of the Neo Geo mini. An unofficial tech demo for the Super Nintendo Entertainment System was released in 2023.

Reception 

RePlay reported Magician Lord to be the tenth most-popular arcade game at the time. On release, Famicom Tsūshin scored the Neo Geo version of the game an average rating of 18 out of 40. On release in North America, it received positive reviews. GamePro gave the Neo Geo version ratings of 5 out of 5 in all five categories of Graphics, Sound, Gameplay, Fun Factor and Challenge. They stated that they "consider this the best action game for the system." GameFans four reviewers scored it 99%, 91%, 92%, and 95%, referring to it as "one of the best action games ever" and "the king of action/platform games". Jason Weitzner of GameFan also gave a positive outlook to the game in their June 1999 issue, praising the graphics and level design, stating that "Magician Lord still remains one of the best 2D games ever". Overall, the game was met with mostly positive reception since its initial release in arcades and later on Neo Geo AES.

Retrospective reviews 

IGN gave the Virtual Console release of Magician Lord a rating of 6.5 out of 10 stating that "Fans of Capcom's Ghouls 'N Ghosts series and the old-school, linear Castlevania adventures would probably be the closest candidates to becoming appreciative players of Magician Lord". Nintendo Life gave it 7 out of 10 concluding "Magician Lord is still a classic game and the fact that people still regard it as a decent platform romp speaks volumes for the quality of this appealing title".

In 2014, HobbyConsolas identified Magician Lord as one of the twenty best games for the Neo Geo AES. Likewise, Time Extension also listed it as one of the best games for the Neo Geo.

Legacy

Cancelled sequel 
In the mid-1990s, a sequel to Magician Lord was supposedly in development and planned to be released for the Neo Geo AES system but it was eventually moved to the Neo Geo CD as a non-linear, free exploration platform game, serving the same purpose as Crossed Swords II did when it came for the system, however, it was cancelled during development along with a sequel to Crystalis.

The premise of the game would have been set two years after the events of the first game. Gal Agiese and Az Atorse have been defeated, and sealed away by the powers of Elta, who became the newly-proclaimed "Magician Lord". During this period of time, darkness and despair loomed over Cadacis and its citizens. If the darkness outweighed the light of the land, Gal Agiese and Az Atorse would be resurrected for the third time, and wreak havoc upon Cadacis once more. The Queen saw the seal breaking again, but using the last of her magic, one of the eight tomes of power arrives in the clutches of Elta. Elta, noticing the cataclysm starting once more, finally reaches the castle. Elta must now find the Queen, and prevent the third resurrection of Gal Agiese and Az Atorse.

Production then carried over toward the Neo Geo Pocket Color in 1998, simply known as Magician Lord. Only an alpha test version of the game for the Neo Geo Pocket Color was ever produced. It was planned to be further developed, but the sequel was cancelled due to Alpha Denshi filing for bankruptcy. After 14 years of seclusion, the alpha test cartridge was finally unearthed by French gaming website GameKult. The game offered more transformations than the first game, and played very similarly to the likes of Metroid and Castlevania: Symphony of the Night, with the main difference being the ability of the Magician Lord to transform at will.

Notes

References

External links 
 Magician Lord at GameFAQs
 Magician Lord at Giant Bomb
 Magician Lord at Killer List of Videogames
 Magician Lord at MobyGames

1990 video games
ACA Neo Geo games
Action video games
ADK (company) games
Arcade video games
D4 Enterprise games
Fantasy video games
Video games about shapeshifting
Multiplayer and single-player video games
Neo Geo games
Neo Geo CD games
Video games about ninja
Nintendo Switch games
Pack-in video games
PlayStation Network games
PlayStation 4 games
Platform games
Side-scrolling platform games
Side-scrolling video games
SNK games
SNK Playmore games
Video games scored by Hideki Yamamoto
Video games scored by Hiroaki Shimizu
Video games scored by Yuka Watanabe
Virtual Console games
Windows games
Xbox One games
Video games developed in Japan
Hamster Corporation games